Xinjiao may refer to:

Protestantism in China
Jahriyya Sufi Order

Other uses
 Xinjiao Town (新滘), Guangdong